Turlough Owen "Tull" Considine (5 October 1898 – 7 July 1980) was an Irish hurler and Gaelic footballer who played for the Clare senior teams. 

A talented dual player, Considine first played for the senior hurling team during the 1918 championship and was a regular on the inter-county scene until his retirement after the 1934 championship. During that time he won one Munster hurling medal. Considine was an All-Ireland runner-up on two occasions.

He also played football with Clare. Appearing in the 1917 All-Ireland Senior Football Championship Final where Clare lost out to Wexford. 

At club level Considine played with the Ennis Dalcassians club and enjoyed much success. In a career that spanned three decades he won six county hurling championship medals and two county football championship medals.

Considine's brothers, Brendan and Willie, were All-Ireland medalists with Clare.

References

1898 births
1979 deaths
Dual players
Ennis Dalcassians Gaelic footballers
Ennis Dalcassians hurlers
Clare inter-county Gaelic footballers
Clare inter-county hurlers
Munster inter-provincial Gaelic footballers
Munster inter-provincial hurlers